Epipomponia is a genus of moths in the Epipyropidae family.

Species
 Epipomponia elongata Jordan, 1928
 Epipomponia multipunctata Druce, 1887
 Epipomponia nawai Dyar, 1904

References

Epipyropidae
Zygaenoidea genera